Screen Two was a British television anthology drama series, produced by the BBC and transmitted on BBC2 from 1985 to 1998 (not to be confused with a run of films shown on BBC2 under the billing Screen 2 between April 1977 and March 1978).

Following the demise of the BBC's Play for Today, which ran from 1970 to 1984, producer Kenith Trodd was asked to formulate a new series of one-off television dramas. However, while Play for Todays style had been a largely studio-based form of theatre on television, the new series was shot entirely on film. This was an attempt by the BBC to repeat the success of Channel 4's television films, many of which had been released in cinemas.

From 1989 to 1998, a companion series, Screen One, was broadcast on the more mainstream BBC1. After appearing more sporadically in the mid-1990s, Screen Two came to an end as the BBC moved its attentions away from single dramas and concentrated production on series and serials instead. The last programme shown under the Screen Two name was Stephen Poliakoff's The Tribe in June 1998.

Plays

References

External links 
 
 Screen Two on IMDb

1985 British television series debuts
1998 British television series endings
1980s British drama television series
1990s British drama television series
1980s British anthology television series
1990s British anthology television series
British drama television series
BBC television dramas
English-language television shows